Daniel Preradovic (born 20 October 1992) is a Swiss footballer.

External links
 

Swiss men's footballers
1992 births
Living people
FC Bern players
Floridsdorfer AC players
Association football forwards
Swiss expatriate footballers
Expatriate footballers in Austria
Swiss expatriate sportspeople in Austria
2. Liga (Austria) players
FC Münsingen players